Libellago finalis, is a species of damselfly in the family Chlorocyphidae. It is endemic to Sri Lanka.  It is threatened by habitat loss.

Sources 

 http://animaldiversity.org/accounts/Libellago_finalis/classification/
 http://slendemics.net/easl/invertibrates/Dragonflyies/dragonflies.html
 https://web.archive.org/web/20150219172210/http://www.wht.lk/storage/book_downloads/CorrigendaAddendum.pdf
 http://www1.biomus.lu.se/search.php?taxa=Odonata&sort=1&country=Sri%20Lanka
 http://www.wildreach.com/reptile/animals/dragonflies.php

Endemic fauna of Sri Lanka
Insects of Sri Lanka
Insects described in 1869